Caprimulgus is a large and very widespread genus of nightjars, medium-sized nocturnal birds with long pointed wings, short legs and short bills. Caprimulgus is derived from the Latin capra, "nanny goat", and mulgere, "to milk", referring to an old myth that nightjars suck milk from goats. The common name "nightjar", first recorded in 1630, refers to the nocturnal habits of the bird, the second part of the name deriving from the distinctive churring song.

Caprimulgus nightjars are found around Afro-Eurasia and Australasia, and like other nightjars they usually nest on the ground. They are mostly active in the late evening and early morning or at night, and feed predominantly on moths and other large flying insects.

Most have small feet, of little use for walking, and their soft plumage is cryptically coloured to resemble bark or leaves. Some species, unusually for birds, perch along a branch, rather than across it, which helps to conceal them during the day. Temperate species are strongly migratory, wintering in the tropics.

Caprimulgus species have relatively long bills and rictal bristles. Many have repetitive and often mechanical songs.

Taxonomy
The genus Caprimulgus was introduced in 1758 by the Swedish naturalist Carl Linnaeus in the tenth edition of his Systema Naturae. The type species is the European nightjar (Caprimulgus europaeus). The name is the Latin word for a nightjar; it combines capra meaning "nanny goat" and mulgere meaning "to milk".  The myth that nightjars suck milk from goats is recounted by Pliny the Elder in his Natural History: "Those called goat-suckers, which resemble a rather large blackbird, are night thieves. They enter the shepherds' stalls and fly to the goats' udders in order to suck their milk, which injures the udder and makes it perish, and the goats they have milked in this way gradually go blind."

Species
The genus contains 35 species.
Red-necked nightjar,  Caprimulgus ruficollis
Jungle nightjar,  Caprimulgus indicus
Grey nightjar,  Caprimulgus jotaka (sometimes included in C. indicus)
Palau nightjar,  Caprimulgus phalaena
European nightjar,  Caprimulgus europaeus
Sombre nightjar,  Caprimulgus fraenatus
Rufous-cheeked nightjar,  Caprimulgus rufigena
Egyptian nightjar,  Caprimulgus aegyptius
Sykes's nightjar,  Caprimulgus mahrattensis
Nubian nightjar,  Caprimulgus nubicus
Golden nightjar,  Caprimulgus eximius
Jerdon's nightjar  Caprimulgus atripennis
Large-tailed nightjar,  Caprimulgus macrurus
Mees's nightjar, Caprimulgus meesi
Andaman nightjar, Caprimulgus andamanicus
Philippine nightjar,  Caprimulgus manillensis
Sulawesi nightjar,  Caprimulgus celebensis
Donaldson Smith's nightjar,  Caprimulgus donaldsoni
Fiery-necked nightjar,  Caprimulgus pectoralis
Montane nightjar,  Caprimulgus poliocephalus
Indian nightjar,  Caprimulgus asiaticus
Madagascar nightjar,  Caprimulgus madagascariensis
Swamp nightjar,  Caprimulgus natalensis
Nechisar nightjar Caprimulgus solala
Plain nightjar,  Caprimulgus inornatus
Star-spotted nightjar,  Caprimulgus stellatus
Savanna nightjar,  Caprimulgus affinis
Freckled nightjar,  Caprimulgus tristigma
Bonaparte's nightjar,  Caprimulgus concretus
Salvadori's nightjar,  Caprimulgus pulchellus
Prigogine's nightjar,  Caprimulgus prigoginei
Bates's nightjar,  Caprimulgus batesi
Long-tailed nightjar,  Caprimulgus climacurus
Slender-tailed nightjar,  Caprimulgus clarus
Square-tailed nightjar,  Caprimulgus fossii
Standard-winged nightjar,  Caprimulgus longipennis
Pennant-winged nightjar,  Caprimulgus vexillarius

References

 
Bird genera
Taxa named by Carl Linnaeus